Maçanet-Massanes is a Rodalies de Catalunya open triangular railway station serving Maçanet de la Selva and Massanes, in Catalonia, Spain.

On , Girona commuter rail service line  also started services, providing a direct connection between the Maresme and the Girona areas without having to interchange at this station.
 

In September 2011, Adif, the owner of the station, concluded the refurbishment of the station in order to make it accessible. This operation involved the installation of elevators and the renovation of the platforms, including the construction of a new station building on the easternmost side of the tracks.

References

External links
 Maçanet-Massanes listing at the Rodalies de Catalunya website [link invalid]
 Maçanet-Massanes listing at the Adif website
 Information and photos of the station at trenscat.cat 

Railway stations in Catalonia
Railway stations in Spain opened in 1860
Rodalies de Catalunya stations
Transport in Selva